Just, also known as Justus II, was bishop of Urgell in northern Spain from 721 till about 733. He was bishop when the invading Moors sacked the city of Urgell.

Very little is known of his episcopate, as records of the time were scant. He probably died when the city fell.

References 

Year of birth missing
Bishops of Urgell
8th-century bishops in al-Andalus